Minuscule 64 (in the Gregory-Aland numbering), ε 1287 (von Soden), formerly known as Ussher 2, is a Greek minuscule manuscript of the New Testament, on parchment leaves. Palaeographically it has been assigned to the 12th century. The manuscript has complex contents and full marginalia.

Description 

The codex contains a complete text of the four Gospels on 443 leaves (size ). The text is written in one columns per page, 18 lines per page. The initial letters are written in gold.

There is also a division according to the Ammonian Sections (in Mark 241 sections, the last in 16:20), with references to the Eusebian Canons.

Subscriptions with numbers of Verses were added by a later hand.

The Greek text of the codex is a representative of the Byzantine text-type. Aland did not place it in any Category.
According to the Claremont Profile Method it represents textual cluster 121 in Luke 1, Luke 10, and Luke 20.

History 

The manuscript once belonged to Thomas Goade († 1638), then to James Ussher. In 1702 it was presented together with minuscule 61 and 63 to Trinity College in Dublin (along with the codices 61 and 63). Then towards to the end of the 17th century it belonged to one John Jones. 
In 1880 Dean Burgon found the manuscript in the library of the Marquis of Bute (Marquess of Bute, Ms. 82 G. 18/19). It was collated, like 63, by Dodwell, used by Brian Walton in his Polyglotte (as Em), used by Mill (as Usser. 2). C. R. Gregory saw it in 1883.

It is currently housed at the Schøyen Collection (Ms 230), at Oslo.

See also 
 List of New Testament minuscules
 Biblical manuscript
 Textual criticism

References

Further reading 

 

Greek New Testament minuscules
12th-century biblical manuscripts